4-cross may refer to:

 Four-cross bike racing
 4-orthoplex polytope